Avatar: The Way of Water is a 2022 American epic science fiction film directed by James Cameron from a screenplay he co-wrote with Rick Jaffa and Amanda Silver, with a story the trio wrote with Josh Friedman and Shane Salerno. Produced by Lightstorm Entertainment and TSG Entertainment, and distributed by 20th Century Studios, it is the sequel to Avatar (2009) and the second installment in the Avatar film series. The film stars Sam Worthington, Zoe Saldaña, Sigourney Weaver, Stephen Lang, and Kate Winslet. Its story follows a Na'vi named Jake Sully (Worthington) as he and his family, under renewed human threat, seek refuge with the Metkayina clan of Pandora.

Avatar: The Way of Water premiered in London on December 6, 2022, and was released in the United States on December 16. Made on a production budget of $350–460million, The Way of Water has grossed $2.303billion, becoming the highest grossing film of 2022 and the third-highest-grossing film of all time. On the review aggregator website Rotten Tomatoes, the film holds an approval rating of 76% based on 431 reviews.

The film has received various awards and nominations. Avatar: The Way of Water garnered two Golden Globe nominations at the 80th ceremony. It won two awards at the 50th Annie Awards. The film received four nominations at the 95th Academy Awards, including Best Picture, Best Sound, Best Production Design; and won for Best Visual Effects. Avatar: The Way of Water was named one of the ten best films of 2022 by the National Board of Review and the American Film Institute.

Accolades

See also 
 List of accolades received by Avatar

Notes

References

External links 
 

Avatar (franchise)
Lists of accolades by film
Disney-related lists